Santiago Ferrando Dietz (born 7 June 1928) is a Peruvian former sprinter. He competed in the men's 100 metres at the 1948 Summer Olympics.

References

External links
 

1928 births
Possibly living people
Athletes (track and field) at the 1948 Summer Olympics
Athletes (track and field) at the 1951 Pan American Games
Peruvian male sprinters
Olympic athletes of Peru
Place of birth missing (living people)
Pan American Games competitors for Peru
20th-century Peruvian people